Salem High School is a secondary school located in Virginia Beach, Virginia.

The school has a Visual and Performing Arts Academy; one of eight magnet programs in Virginia Beach. Students throughout the city interested in these arts can apply. 
The class of 2008 is the first graduating class to include students from the academy.

School history
Salem High School, located at 1993 Sundevil Dr (numbered in honor of the class of 1993), is built on a  site acquired by the School Board in 1985. Construction of the  building began in July 1987. The school, which contains 85 classrooms, an auditorium, a large lecture hall, a large gym, and two auxiliary gyms, opened on September 5, 1989, to a capacity enrollment of just over 2,000 students. A student committee selected the name, SunDevils, to represent Salem High School in the spring of 1989. The school colors are scarlet, black, silver, and white. A life-sized school mascot was unveiled during the 1991–1992 school year; "Sunny the SunDevil" (identical to the Tasmanian Devil from Warner Bros. Looney Tunes) is depicted on school sweatshirts and athletic programs. The Visual and Performing Arts Academy (VPAA) became an integral part of Salem High School in 2004. The student body had one of the largest number of Filipino-Americans in the city.

Visual and Performing Arts Academy 

The Visual and Performing Arts Academy at Salem High School (VPAA) consists of five strands: 
music (both vocal and instrumental), dance, theatre, and visual arts (photography, painting, drawing, etc.). While students typically select one strand as their concentration, they are also encouraged to explore areas outside their selected strand; all seniors participate in an inter-disciplinary final project.

Curricula includes instruction in performance, exhibition, theory, and history of the arts. Independent seminars and performances are also offered throughout the year.

Admission to the program is based on several criteria: an audition/portfolio evaluation, recommendations by core subject teachers as well as previous teachers in the arts, achievement as evidenced by honors or awards in the arts, and participation in extracurricular and community activities.

Chorus department

The Salem High School choirs have received national recognition for their outstanding performances. Choirs from Salem have performed in the White House and National Cathedral (Washington, DC), Carnegie Hall (New York, NY), Walt Disney World (Orlando, FL), Universal Studios (Orlando, FL), Cardiff Cathedral (Cardiff, Wales, UK), and Westminster Abbey (London, England, UK). In addition, they have performed multiple times at the Virginia Music Educators Association annual in-service conference and the Southern Division convention of the Music Educators National Conference, and have been the featured ensemble at the Sweet Adelines International Mid-Winter convention. They have sung in a private performance for actor/singer Jimmy Dean and commissioned works from renowned composer Daniel E. Gawthrop. They have performed in concert with the Old Dominion University Concert Choir, the Christopher Newport University Choir, the Greensboro College Concert Choir, and the Virginia Commonwealth University "Commonwealth Singers." In recent years, they have been honored to work with such outstanding choral musicians as: Weston Noble, Eph Ely, Rodney Eichenberger, Jing Ling-Tam, Kevin Fenton, William Powell, Deen Entsminger, Rebecca Reames, and the world-famous ensemble, "Chanticleer."

The choirs have earned Grand Champion, Outstanding Ensemble, Best in Class, and First Place trophies as well as "Superior" ratings in competitive choral festivals in Orlando FL, Las Vegas NV, Atlanta GA, New York NY, Nashville TN, Gatlinburg TN, Richmond VA, Williamsburg VA, and Virginia Beach, VA, and have earned many "Superior" ratings at the VMEA District 2 choral festivals since the festival's inception (singing Grade VI music, the most challenging level recognized).

They have performed major works including Handel's "Messiah," Rutter's "Requiem," Bach's "Jesu, Meine Freude," Schubert's "Mass in G," and "Mass in F," Britten's "Ceremony of Carols," and Vivaldi's "Gloria."

Vocalists from Salem High School have been selected for the All-Virginia Choir every year since the school opened in 1989, and for the elite VMEA Senior Honors Chorus every year since 1990.

The Academy's most elite choir, Vox Harmonia, performed at the GQ Magazine Gentlemen's Ball in Fall 2008. They were invited by the famous music producer Timbaland and performed in front of him along with other celebrities such as Usher, Hilary Swank, Mark Wahlberg, Forest Whitaker, and James Cameron.

Naval Junior Reserve Officer Training Corps
The NJROTC unit at Salem was established on July 1, 1996, under the authority of Title 10, United States Code, Chapter 102, Section 2031 to "...instill in students in United States secondary educational institutions the values of citizenship, service to the United States, and personal responsibility and a sense of accomplishment." The unit motto is "Do right and fear not".

The unit is a competitive force in Area 5, winning the Distinguished Unit Award for thirteen consecutive years. The unit has also received Unit Achievement once but once again achieving Distinguished Unit once more one year later and currently maintains their Distinguished Unit status to this day. The unit also received Distinguished Unit with Honors status for the first time in the 2017–18 school year. The units Drill, Athletics, and Academic team have been to Nationals three times in Pensacola, Florida, most recently placing seventeenth in the nation in the 2015–2016 school year. The school currently ranks twenty-sixth in the nation based upon the 2017–2018 school year. The unit is led by Senior Naval Science Instructor Chief Warrant Officer Four Ronald McMiller, USN (ret.) and Naval Science Instructor Sergeant Major Timothius Robinson, USMC (ret.)

Academic departments
 Business
 Computer Resource
 English
 Fine Arts
 Foreign Language
 Gifted Program
 Guidance
 Health/P.E.
 Library/Media Center
 Marketing
 Math
 Naval Science (NJROTC)
 Science
 Social Studies
 Special Education
 Technology Education
 Work & Family Studies/Technology

Advanced Placement courses
Salem High School offers the following Advanced Placement courses:
 English: Language and Composition
 English: Literature and Composition
 Statistics
 Calculus AB
 Calculus BC
 Computer Science
 Music Theory
 Environmental Science
 Biology
 Chemistry
 Human Geography
 Psychology
 Comparative Government
 European History
 United States Government and Politics
 United States History
 Art History
 Studio Art - 2D Design
 Studio Art - 3D Design
 Studio Art - Drawing
 French Language and Culture
 German Language and Culture
 Japanese Language and Culture
 Spanish Language and Culture
 Latin
 Spanish Literature

Athletics

State Championships
 Boys Basketball: 2001
 Girls Basketball: 1994
 Girls Gymnastics: 1992
 Girls Volleyball: 1998

Notable alumni

 Isaiah Gardner (born 1985), defensive back of the Toronto Argonauts
 Jason Miyares (born 1976), Virginia State Legislator, Virginia House of Delegates, 2018 Legislator of the Year, current Attorney General of Virginia
 Timothy Mosley ( Timbaland) (born 1972), producer, singer, and rapper
 Caroline Nichols (born 1984), U.S. Olympic Field Hockey player 2008

References

External links
 
 Virginia Beach City Public Schools
 Virginia Beach school mascots and colors
 Salem Football @ VHSL-Reference

Educational institutions established in 1989
Salem High School
High schools in Virginia Beach, Virginia
Schools of the performing arts in the United States
Public high schools in Virginia
1989 establishments in Virginia